Seoul Metro Line 9 Corporation was established in 2004 to operate the Seoul Subway line 9 in Seoul, South Korea.

Lines
Seoul Metro Line 9 Corporation only control parts of 9 but services are provided by Seoul Line9 Operation, a joint venture between Hyundai Rotem (20%) and RATP Dev Transdev Asia (80%).

References

External links

Seoul Metropolitan Subway
Railway companies of South Korea
Transport operators of South Korea
Railway companies established in 2004
Companies based in Seoul